Kastriot is an Albanian male given name, which is derived from the Kastrioti family, a medieval Albanian noble family. The name may refer to:

Kastriot Dermaku (born 1992), Albanian footballer
Kastriot Islami (born 1952), Albanian politician
Kastriot Kastrati (born 1993), Finnish footballer
Kastriot Medhi (born 1934), Brazilian judoka 
Kastriot Peqini (born 1974), Albanian footballer

References

Albanian masculine given names